Maroš Molnár (born February 28, 1973 in Žiar nad Hronom) is a Slovak professional fitness coach and former track and field athlete. Molnár is currently working as a fitness head coach at the international EMPIRE Tennis Academy in Trnava, Slovakia.

University 
Maroš Molnár studied Physical Education and Biology at The Faculty of Physical Education and Sports of Comenius University in Bratislava, Slovakia. He was coached by Miroslav Vavák and Eugen Laco there and run 400 metres.

References 

1973 births
Living people